This is a list of awards and nominations received by French-Canadian film director and writer Denis Villeneuve.

Major associations

Academy Awards

BAFTA Awards

Golden Globe Awards

Other Awards

AACTA International Awards

Abu Dhabi Film Festival

Alliance of Women Film Journalists

Atlantic Film Festival

Austin Film Critics Association

Berlin International Film Festival

Canadian Screen Awards (formerly Genie Awards)

Cannes Film Festival

Critics' Choice Awards

Dallas–Fort Worth Film Critics Association

Denver Film Critics Society

Directors Guild of America Awards

Directors Guild of Canada

Empire Awards

Houston Film Critics Society

Hugo Awards

IndieWire Critics Poll

Jutra Awards

National Board of Review

Online Film Critics Society

People's Choice Awards

San Francisco Film Critics Circle

Satellite Awards

Saturn Awards

St. Louis Gateway Film Critics Association

Teen Choice Awards

Toronto International Film Festival

Vancouver Film Critics Circle

Vancouver International Film Festival

Venice Film Festival

Washington D.C. Area Film Critics Association

Writers Guild of America Awards

Notes

References

External links
 

Villeneuve, Denis